William Robert "Rob" Pinkston IV (born January 30, 1988) is an American actor who appeared during the fourth season of MTV's hidden camera practical joke television series, Punk'd.  He also played Coconut Head on Nickelodeon's Ned's Declassified School Survival Guide. He attended William S. Hart High School, in Santa Clarita, California, a city located north of Los Angeles. He was in Extreme Movie with Ryan Pinkston (no relation) and Frankie Muniz.

Rob currently serves as a StarPower Ambassador for the Starlight Children's Foundation, encouraging other young people to commit their time, energy and resources to help other individuals and working with Starlight to brighten the lives of seriously ill people.

Career

Punk'd
He appeared on Punk'd for the first time when he played a troubled youth in whose apparent fight with his aunt in a parking lot tennis player Serena Williams became involved. After Pinkston stole his aunt's car, Williams helped her pursue Rob until Ashton Kutcher revealed himself, and the situation, as a practical joke.

On MTV's Punk'd for season 4 episode 3, (Faison helped Ashton) he cried in Ned's Declassified School Survival Guide, Kutcher set up a prank on Braff). It all started when Faison went up to Kutcher and said "Listen, we got to get Zach Braff." He later successfully tricked Braff with the help of Rob Pinkston. Pinkston acted like a juvenile delinquent. He asked Scrubs''' stars Donald Faison and Zach Braff to buy beer. When both Braff and Faison refuse, Pinkston and his friends spray-painted on Braff's brand new $100,000 Porsche until Braff and Faison caught them red handed. Braff was enraged against Pinkston, until Kutcher with two of the kids, revealed himself to Braff, saying, "I saw the whole thing goes down, and I got these two!"

Pinkston played a fan of Dallas Mavericks' Dirk Nowitzki, who asked  him to sign an authentic Jersey from Reebok, and then a number of other memorabilia. When he asked Nowitzki to sign Cleveland Cavaliers' LeBron James' Jersey and two Lakers' hats. Nowitzki signed some of the memorabilia until Michael Finley (Dirk's teammate, who is now retired) and his trainer Al told him to say no. When Nowitzki refused to sign more non-Dallas Mavericks goods, Pinkston insulted Nowitzki and his teammates.  After Pinkston asked Nowitzki to sign the menu, Nowitzki was shocked that the menu says: "Hey, Dirk! You've been Punk'd!" Dirk laughed off the joke.

On another episode, Pinkston walked into a clothing store, and met musician Joss Stone, nervous because he can't find his mom. Pinkston fled the store after destroying an expensive statue, after which a nervous Stone told one of the store's employees (also a prankster) that she would pay for the statue. Pinkston then returned with the production's cameras and revealed the joke to Stone.

Other appearances
In 2004, Pinkston played Coconut Head on Nickelodeon's Ned's Declassified School Survival Guide. He got the role in January 2004 on his 16th birthday. Rob appeared as Coconut Head in almost every episode, the only recurring actor to do so. Also in 2005, Rob had a starring role in the feature film The Derby Stallion along with a young Zac Efron. Rob also has a starring role in The Sasquatch Gang, a feature film produced by Jeremy Coon and written/directed by Napoleon Dynamites Tim Skousen, which was set to be released in 2006, but has not been released because the studio that bought the movie was acquired by another company. The movie was released in the fall of 2007.

Pinkston also appeared in the third season Ben 10 episode "Under Wraps", as Todd the farm boy.

Rob was the voice-over on the CBS reality show Kid Nation.

Filmography

FilmThe Sasquatch Dumpling Gang (2006) as Maynard KeyesThe Derby Stallion (2005) as Chuck OvertonExtreme Movie (2008) as Griffin

TelevisionPunk'd (2005) (Season 4 Episode 4) as Field AgentNed's Declassified School Survival Guide (2004–2007) as Coconut HeadiCarly (2009)  (2 episodes in iMake sam girlier and iTake on dingo) as Wendy's Brother

Music videosSkylar Spence'' (2015) (Can't You See) as Protagonist
Say Anything feat. Haley Williams (2008) (Church Channel) as Main Character

References

External links

Rob Pinkston at YouTube
Rob Pinkston at Myspace

1988 births
American male child actors
American male film actors
American male television actors
21st-century American male actors
Male actors from Atlanta
Male actors from Santa Clarita, California
Living people